James Anthony Mulley (born 30 September 1988) is an English semi-professional footballer who plays as a central midfielder or winger for Welwyn Garden City.

Career
Born in London, Mulley began his career with Yeading and successor club Hayes & Yeading United, and was their longest-serving player when he left the club in October 2010. He also spent time on loan at Slough Town. After a spell with Chelmsford City, he signed for AFC Wimbledon in January 2011, initially on non-contract terms. He returned to Hayes & Yeading United on loan in January 2012, and he also had a loan spell at Wealdstone in March 2012. In May 2012 Mulley was released by AFC Wimbledon, having been free to leave the club since January of that year. He later signed for Braintree Town. He moved to Maidenhead United in June 2015. He joined Wingate & Finchley on loan on 2 February 2018. Later that month he joined Hampton & Richmond Borough permanently. In July 2018 he re-joined Maidenhead, making a further 14 appearances before leaving in November. Mulley then joined Enfield Town in February 2019 before joining Bracknell Town in June. Mulley re-joined Enfield Town in November, but played only one game before joining Uxbridge later that month. Mulley joined Ware for the 2021-22 season. He joined Kings Langley in August 2022, before joining Welwyn Garden City in December.

References

1988 births
Living people
English footballers
People from Edgware
Yeading F.C. players
Slough Town F.C. players
Hayes & Yeading United F.C. players
Chelmsford City F.C. players
AFC Wimbledon players
Wealdstone F.C. players
Braintree Town F.C. players
Maidenhead United F.C. players
Wingate & Finchley F.C. players
Hampton & Richmond Borough F.C. players
Enfield Town F.C. players
Bracknell Town F.C. players
Uxbridge F.C. players
Ware F.C. players
Kings Langley F.C. players
Welwyn Garden City F.C. players
English Football League players
National League (English football) players
Isthmian League players
Southern Football League players
Association football midfielders
Footballers from the London Borough of Barnet